This is a list of rivers of Haiti, arranged by drainage basin, with respective tributaries indented under each larger stream's name.

Atlantic Ocean
Dajabón River  (Massacre River)
Grande Rivière du Nord 
Rivière du Limbè
Les Trois Rivières

Gulf of Gonâve
Rivière la Quinte 
Rivière l’Estère
Artibonite River 
Rivière de Fer à Cheval 
Macasía River
Guayamouc River
Rivière Bouyaha
Rivière Canot 
Rivière Lociane
Libón River 
Rivière de Saint-Marc
Rivière Montrouis
Rivière Blanche (Artibonite)
Rivière Blanche (Ouest)
Rivière Grise (Grande Riviere du Cul de Sac)
Momance River 
Rivière de Grand Goâve
Grande Rivière de Nippes
Grande-Anse River

Caribbean Sea
Acul River 
Ravine du Sud
Rivière de Cavaillon 
Rivière des Côtes de Fer
Rivière de Bainet
Grande Rivière de Jacmel
Petite Rivière de Jacmel
Pedernales River

References
, GEOnet Names Server

External links
 
 Les Principales Rivières d'Haiti. www.haiti-reference.com 

Haiti
Rivers of Haiti
Haiti